Massicus pascoei is a species of round-necked longhorn beetles of the subfamily Cerambycinae.

Description
The basic color of the body is pale brown or greyish, with dense luteous pubescence. Prothorax is narrow and rugose and shows broad longitudinal hairy stripes. Elytra are elongated and  gradually narrow posteriorly. Antennae are black, longer than the body.

Distribution and habitat
This species can be found in eastern India, Peninsular Malaysia, Myanmar and Sumatra. It lives in primary mixed dipterocarp forests.

References
 Biolib
 pascoei Worldwide Cerambycoidea Photo Gallery
 Arbec.com

External links

Cerambycini